Acrocercops serriformis is a moth of the family Gracillariidae. It is known from Indonesia (Java), Malaysia (Sabah) and Guadalcanal.

The larvae feed on Jatropha gossypifolia, Ricinus communis and Bauhinia species. They probably mine the leaves of their host plant.

References

serriformis
Moths of Asia
Moths of Oceania
Moths described in 1930